Mauro Bianchi (born 31 July 1937) is an Italian-born Belgian racing driver. He won the 1965 Nürburgring 500 km with his brother Lucien and the 1966 Macau Grand Prix and participated in six editions of the 24 Hours of Le Mans in 1962, 1964, 1965, 1966, 1967 and 1968.

Personal life
Bianchi was born in Milan, Italy, but moved to Belgium in 1946 when he was still a child, with his father who was a race mechanic working, before the Second World War, in the Alfa Romeo competition department.  His brother, Lucien Bianchi, was also a racing driver. They drove to victory together in the 1965 Nürburgring 500 km. Bianchi's grandson, Jules Bianchi, who made his Formula One debut with the Marussia team for the  season competing under the French flag, also died as a result of injuries sustained in a racing accident.

Career
Bianchi joined the Alpine team in 1964, with which he raced in various categories including Formula 3, Formula 2 and endurance. He won the 1966 Macau Grand Prix, making him the only Belgian to do so. Bianchi later won the P1.6 class at the 1967 24 Hours of Le Mans. During the 1968 24 Hours of Le Mans he was involved in a very serious accident. Following his brother's fatal accident at Le Mans in 1969, Bianchi retired from racing.

Subsequently he was an engineer and test driver for Venturi.

References 

1937 births
Living people
Racing drivers from Milan
24 Hours of Le Mans drivers
Belgian racing drivers
World Sportscar Championship drivers
Italian emigrants to Belgium